The 1941 Oklahoma A&M Cowboys football team represented Oklahoma A&M College in the 1941 college football season. This was the 41st year of football at A&M and the third under Jim Lookabaugh. The Cowboys played their home games at Lewis Field in Stillwater, Oklahoma. They finished the season 5–4, 3–1 in the Missouri Valley Conference.

Tackle Hugh Swink and guard Sonny Liles were selected by the conference coaches as first-team players on the 1941 All-Missouri Valley Conference football team. Three other Oklahoma A&M player were named to the second team: halfback Lonnie Jones; fullback Jack Faubion; and end George Darrow.

Schedule

After the season

The 1942 NFL Draft was held on December 22, 1942. The following Cowboy was selected.

References

Oklahoma AandM
Oklahoma State Cowboys football seasons
Oklahoma AandM